Elliot Minor is the debut album from the English pop rock band Elliot Minor, released on 14 April 2008 through Repossession and Warner Bros. Records.

History
The band recorded their debut album at various studios in Los Angeles, California, London and in their hometown of York. The album was confirmed for release in 2007, before being delayed and pushed back to build more promotion. It was eventually confirmed for release on 14 April 2008.

Several promotion copies were leaked onto eBay, however were swiftly removed. Demos for all of the tracks had been available for some time on various torrent websites, and several were also made available on the band's MySpace. To try and counter the leaks, the band offered the album directly from their official online store with the promise of signing the first 500 copies.

Promotion
In the lead up to the album, the band released 4 singles from the album. "Parallel Worlds", "Jessica", "The White One Is Evil" and "Still Figuring Out", with "Parallel Worlds" being re-released before the album release due to a surge of popularity in the band since its original release.

Reception
Upon release, the album debuted at number 17 on the UK Albums Chart, and number 30 on the Irish Albums Chart.

Track listing

Personnel
Alex Davies – vocals, lead and rhythm guitar, piano, string arrangements
Ed Minton – vocals, lead and rhythm guitar
Ed Hetherton – bass guitar
Ali Paul – piano, keyboard, synthesizer
Dan Hetherton – drums, space sounds

Charts

References

2008 albums
Elliot Minor albums

he:Elliot Minor